Bare Necessities or The Bare Necessities may refer to:

 "The Bare Necessities", a song from the 1967 animated feature The Jungle Book
 The Bare Necessities, a precursor of the 1997 film The Full Monty
 Bare Necessities (TV series), a 1999–2001 BBC2 television survival show
 Bare Necessities (company), a clothing retailer